Surulere is a residential and commercial Local Government Area located on the mainland of Lagos in Lagos State, Nigeria, with an area of . At the last census in the year 2006, there were 503,975 inhabitants, with a population density of 21,864 inhabitants per square kilometer. The local government area is bordered by Yaba, Mushin and Ebute-Metta.

History
During the rapid urbanization of Lagos, the city expanded to the west of its lagoon, which included present-day Surulere. Families from different regions of the country have historically settled in Surulere. In addition to the local settlers of Lagos, during the nineteenth century, various emancipated African Brazilians and Cubans, who were referred to as Aguda or Saros, settled in Surulere. Nigerians from the Northern region initially ended at Idi-Araba, while many people from the eastern part were in various quarters but predominantly at Obele, Ikate, and Aguda areas. Residents of Lagos Island who bought or leased land from the government and Aworis settled in New Lagos. In contrast, others lived in the neighborhoods of Itire, Lawanson, Ojuelegba, Animashaun, and Shitta. The New Lagos neighborhood, also known as the Surulere Re-Housing Estate, is among the first public housing projects in Nigeria. Itire, one of the quarters in Surulere has a recognized traditional authority in the Onitire of Itire.

Industry

Emergence
Festac '77, also known as the Second World Black and African Festival of Arts and Culture was a cultural jamboree held in Surulere Lagos, Nigeria, from 15 January 1977 to 12 February 1977. It is home to the Lagos National Stadium (capacity 60,000) built in 1972 for the All-Africa Games. The stadium has been allowed to become increasingly dilapidated since 2002.
However, in preparation for the 2009 Under 17 FIFA World Cup the facilities were improved, and the event kicked off successfully in October 2009.
Surulere also houses the Teslim Balogun Stadium, a multi use Stadium used mainly for football matches with an over twenty four thousand sitting capacity.
The main commercial streets in Surulere are Western Avenue, Adeniran Ogunsanya, Adelabu, Ogunalana drive and Aguda, various open markets are dispersed in different neighborhoods. Industrial establishments are predominantly located at Iponri, Coker and Iganmu. One of the most popular places in Surulere is Ojuelegba. It is known for its crowded setting and regarded as one of the busiest places in Lagos.It is one of the key transport nodes of Lagos, connecting the city's mainlands with Lagos Island and Victoria Island. It's also the place, popular Nigerian musician, Wizkid sang about in his one of his most widely acclaimed single "Ojuelegba".

Media
Film production studios started in Surulere during the late 1980s well into the 1990s. 
It was home to the monthly magazines Newbreed and President, founded by Chief Chris Okolie, until publication ceased in the early 1990s. The Most Beautiful Girl in Nigeria (MBGN) beauty pageant and competition took place at the National Arts Theatre in 1988. In 2018, international sports brand Nike Inc collaborated with Wizkid to release a limited edition sports jersey, bringing notoriety on the cultural presence of Surulere and the city of Lagos to the global scene.

The Beyoncé video "Key to the Kingdom" from Black is King features the Surulere National Arts Theater prominently in its opening shots.

Landmarks and places

Notable people

The following is a list of notable people who were either born in, lived in, are current residents of, or are otherwise closely associated with or around the city of Surulere, Lagos, Nigeria.

See also 

Ojuelegba
Ikeja
Yaba

References

External links

 Surulere Now!

Local Government Areas in Lagos State